(aka Hana Zukin II) is a 1956 black and white Japanese film directed by Katsuhiko Tasaka.

Cast
 Ichikawa Raizō VIII
 Shintaro Katsu

References

External links
  http://www.raizofan.net/link4/movie2/zukin2.htm

Japanese black-and-white films
1956 films
Films directed by Katsuhiko Tasaka
Daiei Film films
1950s Japanese films